Joseph Zimmermann (M.S.F.) (12 December 1923 – 4 December 1988) was a Swiss Catholic prelate who served as bishop of the Roman Catholic Diocese of Morombe in Madagascar.

Zimmermann was born in Birmenstorf, Aargau, Switzerland, and attended the College du Christ-Roi in Nuolen. In 1955 he began working as a missionary in Madagascar.

In 1960, Pope John XXIII created the Roman Catholic Diocese of Morombe and named Zimmermann its bishop. Zimmermann was the first Swiss member of the Missionaries of the Holy Family to be made bishop. On 20 November he was installed at the cathedral in Morombe. As of 1965, the diocese of Morombe contained approximately 121,000 people, 10,000 of whom were Catholic.

In 1988 Zimmermann died in office after suffering a fall. His body is buried in Morombe.

See also

References

1923 births
1988 deaths
Accidental deaths from falls
Accidental deaths in Madagascar
People from Baden District, Aargau
Roman Catholic bishops of Morombe
Swiss expatriates in Madagascar
Swiss Roman Catholic bishops
20th-century Roman Catholic bishops in Madagascar